Clara Elise Bryant (born February 7, 1985, in Glendale, California) is an American actress and lawyer. She is best known for her roles as Amy in Under Wraps and Tru Walker in Tru Confessions. She is an alumna of University of Georgia School of Law. Bone Eater was Clara Bryant's final acting project. After filming Bone Eater Clara retired from acting.

After retiring from acting in 2008, she went on to law school. Today Clara Bryant is a lawyer in Atlanta, Georgia.

Filmography

Film

Television
 1991 Gabriel's Fire as Rachel Goldstein
A Prayer for the Goldsteins (season 1, episode 18), March 7, 1991
 1992 Billy as Annie MacGregor
 1992 Roseanne as Lisa Healy
It's No Place Like Home for the Holidays (season 5, episode 12), December 15, 1992
 1993 Star Trek: Deep Space Nine as Chandra
Move Along Home (season 1, episode 10), March 14, 1993
 2002-2003 Buffy the Vampire Slayer as Molly
Bring on the Night (season 7, episode 10), December 17, 2002
Showtime (season 7, episode 11), January 7, 2003
Potential (season 7, episode 12), January 21, 2003
Get It Done (season 7, episode 15), February 18, 2003
Storyteller (season 7, episode 16), February 25, 2003
Lies My Parents Told Me (season 7, episode 17), March 25, 2003
Dirty Girls (season 7, episode 18), April 15, 2003
 2003 Fastlane as Muffy
Simone Says (season 1, episode 17), March 14, 2003
 2003 Hack as Jessica
To Have and Have Not (season 2, episode 9), November 22, 2003
 2006 Numb3rs as Karen
Double Down (season 2, episode 13), January 13, 2006

Awards and nominations

Awards
 2003 – Young Artist Award – Best Performance in a TV Movie, Miniseries, or Special, Leading Young Actress for Tru Confessions

Nominations
 1998 – Young Artist Award – Best Performance in a TV Movie or Feature Film, Young Ensemble for Under Wraps (shared with Mario Yedidia and Adam Wylie)
 2001 – Young Artist Award – Best Performance in a Feature Film, Supporting Young Actress for L' Amante Perduto

References

External links
 

1985 births
Living people
American child actresses
American film actresses
American television actresses
Actresses from California
University of Georgia School of Law alumni
20th-century American actresses
21st-century American actresses
People from Glendale, California
Georgia (U.S. state) lawyers
21st-century American lawyers
21st-century American women lawyers